Joshua Rush (born December 14, 2001) is an American actor and activist. He is known for playing Cyrus Goodman on the Disney Channel drama series Andi Mack (2017–2019), who is the first openly-gay character to appear on the network. Rush earned significant praise and media coverage for his performance, as well as a Young Entertainer Award in 2019.

Rush began his career as a child actor, appearing in short films and commercials, and playing a recurring role on the series Heroes (2009). For playing Turner in the feature film Parental Guidance (2012), he received two Young Artist Award nominations. His voice roles includes Breehn on the Cartoon Network series Clarence (2014–2016), Bunga on the Disney Junior series The Lion Guard (2016–2019) and the titular character on the DreamWorks series Where's Waldo? (2019–2021).

Early life 
Rush was born in Houston, Texas to Adam and Beryt (née Kiselstein) Rush. His father is a marketing strategist and his mother is a corporate documentary producer.

Personal life
Rush came out as bisexual on August 6, 2019. In February 2020, Rush opened up about his parents' divorce and his mental health issues in a Teen Vogue article.
He currently lives in Carson, California.

Career

Early work (2001–2009) 
Rush was ten months old when he first appeared in a local television special. By age 2, he had the ability to identify cars by logo and body style, and was featured on the KHOU morning news in a segment on how to raise "smart kids." Before working on Heroes, Rush appeared on Private Practice, and tailored several film credits, such as Blue Boy, The Journal, and Mindsight. He also acted in commercials for Space Center Houston and Safeco Insurance, and an e-card for americangreetings.com.

In 2009, Rush appeared on The Jay Leno Show as the "Super Duper Nanny Son." The same year he also appeared on Medium as Tanner Campbel, the boy in the banana costume, and on Criminal Minds as Ronny Downey. Rush's first major television role came in 2009 when he was cast on Heroes. He played Zachary Quinto's character, Sylar, at a young age. This recurring role was part of a major plot point in season three. After Heroes, Rush had minor roles on Parenthood, CSI: NY, and Special Agent Oso.

Acting breakthrough (2010–2017) 
In 2010, Rush began portraying a young version of Zachary Levi's character Chuck Bartowski on Chuck. In this role, he worked with such actors as Scott Bakula and Linda Hamilton. Following his work on Chuck, Rush did ADR work on the Hallmark Channel movie November Christmas, and commercials for McDonald's and GameStop. In 2012, Rush appeared as Turner Simmons in the feature film Parental Guidance, which earned him a Young Artist Award nomination as Best Supporting Young Actor Age Ten and Under in a Feature Film.

From 2017 to 2019, he gained prominence through his role as Cyrus Goodman, one of the two best friends of the title character on the Disney Channel series Andi Mack. Rush, who is Jewish, requested Andi Mack creator and executive producer Terri Minsky, also Jewish, to write a bar mitzvah scene for his character, which occurs in Season 2 Episode 13, "Cyrus' Bash-Mitzvah!". Rush's performance was praised, and he is noted for having played the first gay main character on Disney Channel, and the first to have a same-sex love interest, TJ Kippen (Luke Mullen).

Rush also appeared as Jacob in the 2015 thriller film Emelie. He voiced Toby in Netflix and DreamWorks Animation's The Adventures of Puss in Boots and Breehn on Cartoon Network's Clarence. From 2016 to 2019, he voiced Bunga on the Disney Junior series The Lion Guard.

Political ventures (2018–present) 
Rush started a weekly news series on social media in 2018, titled News in a Rush, covering politics and current events in minute-long videos aimed to make younger viewers understand certain topics. Rush volunteered for the 2018 congressional campaigns of Beto O'Rourke, Ben McAdams, Harley Rouda, and Katie Porter. He served as the Under 18 Ambassador for National Absentee Ballot Day.

In 2019, Rush interned at the United States House of Representatives. He told Teen Vogue in an October 2019 interview that he identifies "as a Democrat, probably on the more progressive wing." Rush was a surrogate for the Bernie Sanders 2020 presidential campaign. He then volunteered for Senator Ed Markey's reelection campaign, as well as interviewing several down-ballot congressional candidates. He is a panelist for the Geena Davis Institute on Gender in Media.

In April 2019, it was announced he would voice the titular character in DreamWorks Animation Television series on Universal Kids, Where's Waldo?. In February 2021, Rush announced that he has started a new job as the communications director for the Utah Democratic Party.

He is also a member of the Democratic Socialists of America.

Filmography

Film

Television

Awards and nominations

References

External links 
 
 News in a Rush

Living people
2001 births
21st-century American male actors
Activists from Texas
American child activists
American male child actors
American male film actors
American male television actors
American male voice actors
American political activists
American political commentators
Bisexual male actors
Jewish American male actors
LGBT Jews
LGBT people from Texas
Male actors from Houston
Members of the Democratic Socialists of America
21st-century American Jews
American bisexual actors